The Kuwaiti Futsal Federation Cup started in 2009 in which Al-Fahaheel FC won against Al-Salmiya SC to be crowned the first champion along with Al-Yarmouk SC winning the Kuwaiti Futsal League.

Champions

 2009–10: Al-Fahaheel FC
 2010–11: Al Qadsia SC
 2011–12: Al Qadsia SC
 2012–13: Al-Arabi SC
 2013–14: Al Qadsia SC
 2014–15: Al Qadsia SC 3–2 Al-Arabi SC
 2015–16: Al Qadsia SC 5–2 Al-Arabi SC
 2016–17: Kazma SC 2–1 Kuwait SC
 2017–18: Kuwait SC 2–1 Kazma SC
 2018–19: Al Qadsia SC 5–3 Al-Salmiya SC
 2019–20: Cancelled due to the COVID-19 pandemic 
 2020–21: Al Qadsia SC 7–3 Al-Salmiya SC
 2021-22: Kuwait SC 5–4 Al-Arabi SC

References

2
Football cup competitions in Kuwait
2009 establishments in Kuwait